Katherine Alvarado Araya (born 3 March 1988) is a Costa Rican taekwondo practitioner.

She competed in the -67 kg event at the 2014 Pan American Taekwondo Championships in Aguascalientes, Mexico. According to the Costa Rican Olympic Committee, her best historical ranking in the -67 kg category was at 13th place worldwide. In 2019, she planned to compete in the 2019 World Taekwondo Grand Prix in Japan.

In March 2020, Alvarado participated in the Pan American Qualification Tournament in Heredia, ultimately reaching quarterfinals before elimination.

References

1988 births
Living people
Costa Rican taekwondo practitioners
Sportspeople from San José, Costa Rica
Pan American Taekwondo Championships medalists
Taekwondo practitioners at the 2007 Pan American Games
Taekwondo practitioners at the 2011 Pan American Games
Taekwondo practitioners at the 2015 Pan American Games
Taekwondo practitioners at the 2019 Pan American Games
Pan American Games competitors for Costa Rica